A.S. Trikala 2000 B.C. was a Greek professional basketball club located in Trikala, Greece. The club was commonly known as either shortly Trikala  or Trikala 2000. Trikala previously competed in the Greek League, the top tier of Greek basketball.

History

The Athletic Association of Trikala 2000 was founded on September 13, 1999, following the merger of local Trikala teams Danaos and Sporting. The club had a rapid rise up the Greek basketball leagues. In 2002, just three years after they were founded, Trikala won promotion to the 3rd-tier level Greek B Basket League. In 2006, they again won promotion, that time to the 2nd-tier level Greek A2 Basket League. Just two years later, they completed their journey, by gaining promotion to the top-tier level Greek Basket League, after winning the A2 League, during the 2007–08 season.

The team's first season in the top league in Greece was a relatively successful and dramatic one, as they safeguarded their survival in the league, in the last game of the season, on April 22, 2009. In October 2010, the club went bankrupt.

Honors and titles
Greek 2nd Division:
2008

Notable players

Greece:
  Georgios Apostolidis
  Dimitris Bogdanos
  Dimitris Charitopoulos
  Nikos Kaklamanos
  Dimitris Marmarinos
  Makis Nikolaidis
  Petros Noeas
  Michalis Polytarchou
  Vassilis Symtsak
  Michalis Tsairelis

Europe:
  Bojan Bakić
  Giorgi Tsintsadze
  Miha Zupan

USA:
  A.J. Abrams
  William Avery
 - Jelani Gardner
  Kasib Powell
  David Young

Oceania:
  Mark Dickel

Head coaches
 Vangelis Angelou
 Yannis Christopoulos

External links
Trikala B.C. Website 
Eurobasket.com Team Page

Basketball teams in Greece
Basketball teams established in 1999
Defunct basketball teams in Greece
Sport in Trikala
1999 establishments in Greece
Basketball teams disestablished in 2010
2010 disestablishments in Greece